The New Conservative Party (NCP) was the name of two now-defunct political parties in Japan. The first of the two parties was founded on April 3, 2000 by 21 lower house and 6 upper house defectors from the Democratic Party of Japan (DPJ). It was then dissolved on December 23, 2002. A new party of the same name (保守新党 Hoshu Shintō)  was then founded on December 25, 2002 by Hiroshi Kumagai, also a defector from the DPJ.  The party eventually merged with the Liberal Democratic Party after the 2003 election.

First New Conservative Party

The NCP was led by party president Chikage Oogi, a former Takarazuka actress. The founding members defected from the Liberal Party after then-leader Ichiro Ozawa decided to leave an alliance with the conservative Liberal Democratic Party. The New Conservative Party became part of a three-party ruling Coalition with the Liberal Democratic Party and New Komeito. The NCP was dissolved on December 23, 2002.

Second New Conservative Party
Hiroshi Kumagai and three other disgruntled Democratic Party of Japan members (Takao Sato, Zenjiro Kaneko and Eriko Yamatani) defected from the party in December 2002 and formed the second New Conservative Party with former members of the first New Conservative Party. The party was a conservative reformist party and was very right-wing. After the November 2003 general election, the New Conservative Party was left with only four members in the House of Representatives, down from nine prior to the election. Among the losers in the election was the party president, Hiroshi Kumagai.

On November 10, 2003, then-Prime Minister Koizumi proposed that the NCP merge with the Liberal Democratic Party. Following the proposal, the Secretary-General of the NCP, Toshihiro Nikai, confirmed the merger. After all, both parties were conservative.

"We humbly received the proposal and, after discussion within the party, we agreed to accept the proposal to achieve the policies we promised to voters," Secretary-General Nikai stated on November 10, 2003.

The party is now completely merged with the Liberal Democratic Party of Japan.

Leaders of NCP

Electoral results

House of Representatives

House of Councillors

Notes

References

See also
Politics of Japan
Liberal Democratic Party (Japan)
2003 Japan general election

Defunct political parties in Japan
2000 establishments in Japan
2003 disestablishments in Japan
Political parties established in 2000
Political parties disestablished in 2003
Conservative parties in Japan